Jubilee Field Ground is a multipurpose stadium in Nagaon, Assam, India. The ground is mainly used for organizing matches of football, cricket and other sports. The stadium has hosted a Ranji Trophy match  in 1951 when Assam cricket team played against Orissa cricket team  but since then the stadium has hosted non-first-class matches.

References

External links 

 Cricketarchive
 Cricinfo

Sports venues in Assam
Cricket grounds in Assam
Sports venues completed in 1951
1951 establishments in Assam
20th-century architecture in India